Maccabi Tel Aviv() was an Israeli women's football club from Tel Aviv, a sub-division of Maccabi Tel Aviv. The club competed in the Israeli First League, finishing fourth in each season and the Israeli Women's Cup, but folded in 2002

References

Women's football clubs in Israel
Association football clubs established in 1998
Association football clubs disestablished in 2000
Defunct football clubs in Israel
Maccabi Tel Aviv F.C.